In the Pink is a 1984 album of songs by James Galway and Henry Mancini on RCA.

Track listing
All tracks composed by Henry Mancini; except where noted.
Side A:
"The Pink Panther" – 3:14
"Meggie's Theme" – 3:18 (from The Thorn Birds)
"Breakfast at Tiffany's" – 3:07
"Pennywhistle Jig" – 2:08 (from The Molly Maguires)	
"Crazy World" (Mancini, Leslie Bricusse) – 3:08 (from Victor/Victoria)
"The Thorn Birds Theme" – 3:01
"Pie in the Face Polka" (from The Great Race) - 2:26
Side B:
"Baby Elephant Walk" – 3:00
"Two for the Road" (Mancini, Bricusse) – 3:14
"Speedy Gonzales" – 2:10
Theme from "The Molly Maguires" – 6:04
Medley: Three by Mancini and Mercer "Days of Wine and Roses"; "Charade"; "Moon River" – 6:04
Cameo for Flute "... for James." – 4:02

References

1984 albums
James Galway albums
Henry Mancini albums
RCA Victor albums